Krasnoznamensk (lit. It has a population of

History
The earliest surviving German language record of Krasnoznamensk dates from 1521 under the name Haselpusch, meaning hazel bush in German, while Russian sources give the date of the earliest record as 1576 and other sources state that it was established in 1734. The village had a church by 1578, but it burned down in 1661 and the replacement building had to be taken down in 1869 due to severe structural defects. The town was part of the Kingdom of Poland as a fief held by the Teutonic Order until 1525, and by Ducal Prussia afterwards.

It belonged to the Kingdom of Prussia since 1701 and the German Empire since the unification of Germany in 1871, and was located in the province of East Prussia. In the early 18th century the town's name was changed to Lasdehnen, based on the Old Prussian language term for hazel bushes, and the current Gothic Revival church was built between 1874 and 1877. Four annual fairs were held in the town in the late 19th century. In 1938, during a massive Nazi campaign of renaming of placenames, it was Germanized to Haselberg (literally "hazel mountain") due to the Baltic origins of its prior name.

By 1945, during World War II, Haselberg's ethnic German population had largely fled before the advance of the Red Army in 18 January. Following the end of the war Haselberg was included in the portion of the former province of East Prussia annexed by the Soviet Union that was organized into Kaliningrad Oblast of the Russian SFSR. The historical regional capital of nearby Schloßberg (still commonly known by its pre-1938 name Pillkallen, now Dobrovolsk) had been severely damaged during the course the war, so Soviet authorities relocated Pillkallen's former administrative functions to Haselberg, which had suffered less damage. On 7 April 1946, the Soviets renamed the town as Krasnoznamensk, literally "Red Banner Town", and the following year became the administrative center of the new Krasnoznamensky District.

Administrative and municipal status
Within the framework of administrative divisions, Krasnoznamensk serves as the administrative center of Krasnoznamensky District. As an administrative division, it is, together with two rural localities, incorporated within Krasnoznamensky District as the town of district significance of Krasnoznamensk.

Within the framework of municipal divisions, since May 5, 2015, the territories of the town of district significance of Krasnoznamensk and of three rural okrugs of Krasnoznamensky District are incorporated as Krasnoznamensky Urban Okrug. Before that, the town of district significance was incorporated within Krasnoznamensky Municipal District as Krasnoznamenskoye Urban Settlement.

Demographics

Population trends
1,294 (1885 Census)
1,857 (1910 Census)
2,065 (1933 Census)
2,070 (1939 Census)
2,843 (1959 Census)
2,911 (1970 Census)

Ethnic composition
According to the 2010 census: Russians - 87.4%, Lithuanians - 2.8%, Ukrainians - 2.5%, Belarusians - 2.5%, Roma - 1%, Armenians - 1%, Germans - 0.9%, Tatars - 0.6%, Poles - 0.5%, others - 0.8%

Krasnoznamensk is in the ethnographic region known as Lithuania Minor, and Lithuanian cultural organizations exist in the town.

Where religion is recorded from the census process, pre-1945 census data show the religious affiliation of the population as Prussian Evangelical.

External links
Mojgorod.ru. Entry on Krasnoznamensk

References

Notes

Sources

Cities and towns in Kaliningrad Oblast
Krasnoznamensky District